HKMU may refer to:
 Hong Kong Metropolitan University, statutory university in Ho Man Tin, Hong Kong
 Hubert Kairuki Memorial University, private medical university in Dar es Salaam, Tanzania
 Makindu Airport (ICAO airport code), airport in Makindu, Kenya